Renzo Martinelli (born 1948) is an Italian film director and screenwriter. He directed more than ten films since 1994.

Selected filmography

References

External links 

1948 births
Living people
Italian film directors
People_from_the_Province_of_Monza_e_Brianza